Richard Mercer is an Australian radio presenter.

Mercer hosted nights on Mix 106.5 from July 1997 until December 2013. His show mostly consisted of the segment 'Love Song Dedications', where listeners would call in to tell Mercer about their love life, and then ask for him to play a song, dedicated to somebody they loved. After Mercer left Mix 106.5, he moved to sister Australian Radio Network station 101.7 WSFM before leaving at the end of 2015.

Prior to hosting Love Song Dedications, Richard was program director and morning announcer at 2KA, then ONE FM 96.1 in Penrith.

Mercer is in a relationship with a person named Sheryn, who he dedicated the last Love Song Dedication to.

References

External links
 Richards last Love Song Dedication 

Australian radio personalities
Living people
Date of birth missing (living people)
Year of birth missing (living people)